Dyleň is a mountain in the Karlovy Vary Region of the Czech Republic.

The summit is located in the Stará Voda municipality.

Local tradition holds that Napoleon Bonaparte declared Tillenberg the geographical midpoint of Europe in 1813.

The German name provided the title of the epic poem Der Tillenberg: Ein Sagenschatz aus dem Egerlande (A Treasury of Tales from the Egerland) published in 1904 by Ernst Freimut (pseudonym of Johann (Hans) Sommert).

On the summit is a set of prominent buildings, which were used by the Soviet Union for electronic espionage into Germany during the Cold War. Now it is a radio and television transmission tower.

References

External links
Dylen (Tillenberg), 940 m – WikiMapia

Mountains and hills of the Czech Republic
Mountains and hills of the Upper Palatine Forest